O&M Fútbol Club is a football team based in Santo Domingo, Dominican Republic. The team represents the Universidad Organización y Método and is currently playing in the Primera División de Republica Dominicana

Currently the team plays at the 27,000 capacity Estadio Olímpico Félix Sánchez.

History
O&M FC is a Professional Football Club of the Dominican Republic based in the city of Santo Domingo and represents the Dominican University O & M. Currently the club participates in the Liga Dominicana de Fútbol. This the first university to penetrate professional Dominican sports.

Current squad

Achievements
Copa Dominicana de Fútbol runners-up 2015

Notable players

External links

Football clubs in the Dominican Republic
University and college association football clubs